Aida Tomescu (born October 1955) is a Romanian and Australian contemporary artist who is known for her abstract paintings, collages, drawings and prints. Tomescu is a winner of the Dobell Prize for Drawing, the Wynne Prize for Landscape and the Sir John Sulman Prize, by the Art Gallery of New South Wales.

Early life and education 
Tomescu was born in October 1955 in Bucharest, Romania where she lived until age 23. She arrived in Australia one year later, in May 1980. She studied at the Institute of Fine Arts in Bucharest in the late 1970s. In 1977 she graduated with a diploma in painting and two years later she had her first solo exhibition. In 1983 she completed a post-graduate diploma in visual arts at the City Art Institute in Sydney.

The seed of her career as a painter became planted in Aida Tomescu while studying at the Institute of Fine Arts in Bucharest in the late 1970s, when she closely studied the work of Cézanne and his legacy through cubism. She read Kandinsky's famous essay, "Concerning the spiritual in art" ... When she emigrated to Australia from Romania and took up study at the City Art Institute in Sydney in 1980 she was ripe for a dedication to abstract painting from which she never wavered.

Career 
After her initial traditional studio- and theory-based training in Bucharest, Tomescu's work gradually evolved towards abstraction. She was affected by the bright Australian light, which eventually worked its way into her work. Tomescu said: "One of the first things that happened here is that I bought bigger canvases, I increased the scale. Though I was continuing as a painter, I needed a whole new vocabulary, and this would only develop gradually." Her work has been informed by Paul Cézanne and cubism, Willem de Kooning and the ideas of Wassily Kandinsky expressed in his 1910 book Concerning the Spiritual in Art. When she emigrated to Australia from Romania she studied at the City Art Institute in Sydney in 1980, and has not diverted from her interest in abstract painting.

In 1986 Tomescu was invited to the Victorian Print Workshop, now the Australian Print Workshop. As an artist who regarded drawing as an important part of her practice, she found the experience of working with etching plates liberating as she had to "curb any craving for precision and for controlling an image". At the same time, Tomescu "loved its transformative powers over my drawing, the way in which it liberated my drawing in the acid tray. Materiality was removed entirely by the acid, so I was left with an image that is really vulnerable, open."

Tomescu is represented by Flowers Gallery and Jensen Gallery.

Exhibitions

Tomescu held her first exhibition "based on still-life" in 1979, in Bucharest. She has exhibited regularly in Australia and internationally, with over 30 solo exhibitions to date.

From 1985 to 1995, she was exhibiting at the Coventry Gallery, Sydney with "regular solo shows of her dark abstract paintings".

In 1987 Tomescu exhibited in Canberra at the Ben Grady Gallery. Sasha Grishin, senior art critic for The Canberra Times found her work to be in "a bit of a time warp" back to a time when abstract expressionism was the "dominant style" and the challenge for the artist would be, after "redisovering" abstract expressionism, to "build on it and create their own unique style".

In 1991, a smaller version of the Art Gallery of New South Wales touring exhibition Abstraction was shown at the Nolan Gallery, Lanyon ACT. Art critic Sonia Barron, writing for The Canberra Times, was disappointed in the exhibition but found at least that Tomescu communicated "a spiritual anxiety in her dark expressionist canvases".

In 1994, the art collector and art gallery owner Chandler Coventry showed a collection of 300 prints he had acquired in the exhibition Obsession. The diverse collection of works included 10 works by Aida Tomescu and art critic Sasha Grishin remarked that her worked "places her as one of the leading exponents of gestural abstraction in this country".

In 2009 her work was the subject of a major survey exhibition, Aida Tomescu: Paintings and Drawings at the Drill Hall Gallery, Australian National University. Art critic John McDonald expressed admiration for Tomescu's "sense of colour and surface texture". He referred to the paint being laid on in "concrete-like slabs" with the works on paper consisting of a "frenzied mass of squiggles and disjointed calligraphy" and found the body of work "alive and convincing".

Tomescu's graphic works were included in the major survey of prints and drawings Out of Australia at the British Museum, London in 2011.

Tomescu's work was included in a major touring exhibition, Abstraction: Celebrating Australian Women Abstract Artists, a touring exhibition (2017–2019) from the National Gallery of Australia.

Other exhibitions include The Triumph of Modernism at TarraWarra Museum of Art, Art Basel Hong Kong (2019, 2018, 2017 & 2015), Wet, Wet, Wet, Fox Jensen McCrory Auckland (2019) The Anatomy of Gesture, Fox Jensen McCrory Auckland (2017); Chromoffection, Fox Jensen McCrory Auckland (2016), 'The Heide Collection’, Heide Museum of Modern Art (2015); Vibrant Matter, TarraWarra Museum of Art (2013), The Mind’s Eye, Art Gallery of South Australia (2013), Forever Young, Heide Museum of Modern Art (2011), and Contemporary Encounters, Ian Potter Centre: National Gallery of Victoria (2010).

Critical reception 
Australian art historian Patrick McCaughey writes of Tomescu in his 2014 book Strange Country: Why Australian Painting Matters:
[One] of the best painters at work in Australia today, Aida Tomescu has revived a full-throated painterly abstraction, where colour and gesture flow through the work...she knits over and under surfaces in which the light and colour seem to be pulsing from within the work, not just laid on top. You feel her presence and her sensibility, moment to moment on the surface, in the painting.

Art critic for The Sydney Morning Herald John McDonald wrote on August 25, 2012:

Aida Tomescu, who is consolidating a reputation as one of Australia's most formidable living abstract painters...is making the point that she is not interested in arbitrary "mark-making" — she is after something she calls an "image". Even though most people might associate this word with a recognisable object, Tomescu's image is very different. It seems closer to the image of Christ or the Virgin in Byzantine art, which was meant to embody the presence of the holy being in the work.McDonald, John. "Pathways to other worlds", The Sydney Morning Herald, 1 September 2007

Christopher Allen in Art in Australia from Colonization to Postmodernism wrote:

"Aida Tomescu’s paintings…draws us into the intense concentration of its own making…(she) starts with energy and movement and seems to be trying to do the near-impossible — to reach stillness from such a starting-point."

Awards and commissions 
 Sir John Sulman Prize, 1996 (Grey to Grey)
 The Wynne Prize, 2001
 The Dobell Prize for Drawing, 2003
 Winner of the inaugural LFSA Arts 21 Fellowship at the Heide Museum of Modern Art, 1996, Melbourne
 Victorian Print Workshop residency, Myer Art Foundation, 1986

Collections
 National Gallery of Australia (70 works, including Alba II 2002 and Ithaca V 1997)
 National Gallery of Victoria (9 works, including Oz and Seria Unu III)
 Art Gallery of New South Wales (27 works, including Negru I and Negru IV)
Auckland Art Gallery, New Zealand (Zattere/Margharita)
 British Museum, London (9 prints, including Ithaca IX and Ithaca VI)
 QAGOMA (2 works, Semn 1990, and Vis 1, Vis 2, Vis 3)
 Art Gallery of South Australia

References

Further reading
 Hart, Deborah, Catalogue essay: "Aida Tomescu: States of becoming", in Aida Tomescu: Paintings and Drawings, Drill Hall Gallery, 2009
 https://catalogue.nla.gov.au/Record/5399721

External links 
 Aida Tomescu's official website
 Artist profile, Fox Jensen/Fox Jensen McCrory Gallery

Living people
1955 births
Artists from Bucharest
Romanian emigrants to Australia
Australian women painters
21st-century Australian women artists
21st-century Australian painters
20th-century Australian women artists
20th-century Australian painters